KRDZ (1440 AM, "1440/106.9 Classic Hits") is a radio station broadcasting a classic hits music format. Licensed to Wray, Colorado, United States, the station is currently owned by Media Logic, LLC and features programming from Westwood One.

History
The station was assigned the call letters KRQZ on October 5, 1982.  On October 9, 1987, the station changed its call sign to the current KRDZ.

References

External links

RDZ